Fever Hunting is the fourth studio album by American hardcore punk band Modern Life Is War. It was released on September 9, 2013 through Deathwish Inc., as the band's first release in six years since 2007's Midnight in America after reforming in 2012. The album features the band's original lineup and was produced by Kurt Ballou of Converge.

Track listing 
All songs composed by Modern Life Is War.
 "Old Fears, New Frontiers" – 1:13
 "Health, Wealth, & Peace" – 2:29
 "Chasing My Tail" – 4:35
 "Media Cunt" – 2:01
 "Blind Are Breeding" – 3:50
 "Fever Hunting" – 2:48
 "Dark Water" – 2:16
 "Brothers in Arms Forever" – 3:53
 "Currency" – 3:19
 "Cracked Sidewalk Surfer" – 1:55
 "Find a Way" – 2:36

Personnel 
Modern Life Is War
 Jeffrey Eaton – vocals
 John Eich – guitar
 Matt Hoffman – guitar
 Chris Honeck – bass
 Tyler Oleson – drums

Additional musicians
 Kat Demarco – backing vocals
 Pete Marullo – backing vocals
 Rob Samps – backing vocals

Production and artwork
 Kurt Ballou – engineer, mixing, producer
 Jacob Bannon – artwork
 Brad Boatright – mastering
 Modern Life Is War – producer

References 

2013 albums
Modern Life Is War albums
Albums produced by Kurt Ballou
Albums with cover art by Jacob Bannon
Deathwish Inc. albums